Mourisa was a town in the borderlands between ancient Isauria and Lycaonia, inhabited in Roman times. The name does not occur among ancient authors but is inferred from epigraphic and other evidence.

Its site is located near Akören, Asiatic Turkey.

References

Populated places in ancient Isauria
Populated places in ancient Lycaonia
Former populated places in Turkey
Roman towns and cities in Turkey
History of Konya Province